Flemming Hansen (born 11 February 1944) is a former Danish cyclist. He competed in the individual road race and team time trial events at the 1964 Summer Olympics.

References

External links
 

1944 births
Living people
People from Køge Municipality
Danish male cyclists
Olympic cyclists of Denmark
Cyclists at the 1964 Summer Olympics
Sportspeople from Region Zealand